A list of thriller films released in the 1970s.

Notes

1970s
Thriller